Sophie Becker (born 16 May 1997) is an Irish athlete. She competed in the women's 400 metres event at the 2021 European Athletics Indoor Championships. She took part in the mixed 4 × 400 metres relay event at the 2020 Summer Olympics.

References

External links
 

1997 births
Living people
Irish female sprinters
Olympic athletes of Ireland
Athletes (track and field) at the 2020 Summer Olympics
Place of birth missing (living people)
20th-century Irish women
21st-century Irish women